The Province of Como is a province in the north of the Lombardy region of Italy and borders the Swiss cantons of Ticino and Grigioni to the North, the Italian provinces of Sondrio and Lecco to the East, the Province of Monza and Brianza to the south and the Province of Varese to the West. The city of Como is its capital — other large towns, with more than 10,000 inhabitants, include Cantù, Erba, Mariano Comense and Olgiate Comasco. Campione d'Italia also belongs to the province and is enclaved in the Swiss canton of Ticino.

, the main commune by population are:

The Lugano Prealps cover the territory of the province, and the most important body of water is the glacial Lake Como.

See also
List of municipalities of the Province of Como
Giuseppe Terragni
Antonio Sant'Elia
Alessandro Volta

References

External links
Official website 

 
Como
Como